Mayukh Sen is an American writer and author of a nonfiction book, Taste Makers: Seven Immigrant Women Who Revolutionized Food in America. He was nominated for a James Beard Award in 2018 and 2019, winning the award in 2018 for his profile of Princess Pamela.

Writing career 
 
He is the author of Taste Makers: Seven Immigrant Women Who Revolutionized Food in America, which came out on November 16th, 2021 from W.W. Norton & Co. The nonfiction book is a journey through America's modern culinary history, told through the lives of seven path-breaking female chefs and food writers.

Food writing 
Sen got into food writing "by accident" when he began working at Food52. The stories he wrote there often focused on the marginalized, or on experiences that set him apart from other staff. The first piece of his to get significant attention was about fruitcake on Food52: "As someone who's queer and Bengal, I grew up eating fruitcake and really treasuring it. I sit in between these two meanings of the word and explored that whole idea in detail, where I metabolized all of that personal writing very early on in my food writing career." It was called "How—and Why—Did Fruitcake Become a Slur?"

At just 26, Sen won a James Beard Journalism Award in Profile Writing, for a longform profile on Princess Pamela. The James Beard Award is known as the “Oscar of the food world.” Sen didn't expect to win, and wrote his acceptance speech on the back of a gum wrapper on the cab ride over.

Princess Pamela was a soul food restaurateur who vanished when she was 70. In the article, Sen says, "You could call her the doyenne of soul food for New York, when the city had precious few soul food restaurants. She earned this title during a time when her black skin, her womanhood, and her Southern accent weren't just signifiers of identity; they were handicaps that limited her possibilities in the culinary world. Pamela’s defiance of odds was, for these reasons alone, both singular and unprecedented."

Sen was also nominated for the 2019 James Beard MFK Fisher Distinguished Writing Award. His work has been anthologized in The Best American Food Writing 2019 and The Best American Food Writing 2021.

Personal life 
Sen is queer and of Bengali descent. Sen went to Stanford University, where he studied film. While he was an undergraduate, his father was diagnosed with lung cancer, and he moved back to New York to help care for him. His father was a film buff, and he was drawn to writing about film initially. When his father died, he began writing through his grief. “I have always been attracted, for some reason or another, to subjects who are dead or forgotten in some way,” he says. “I became conscious of why I was attracted to these kinds of stories and how I was pursuing them and what kinds of things I did while I was reporting them, after my dad’s death.”

Sen teaches food journalism at New York University. He has also taught creative nonfiction classes with Kundiman. He is currently sober. "As a sober person, I’ve been ruthless with the red pen. I can read sentences aloud and understand when something isn’t quite hanging together or when a detail isn’t germane to the overall story," he said in an interview.

References 

American food writers
Bengali writers
James Beard Foundation Award winners
Living people
Year of birth missing (living people)